Sidney A. Sage, Jr. (December 26, 1852 – August 2, 1909) was an American businessman and politician.

Born in Racine, Wisconsin, Sage went to Beloit College. Sage was a hay merchant and dealer in agricultural implements in Corliss, Wisconsin. Sage served in the Wisconsin State Assembly in 1881 and was a Republican. Sage died in Chicago, Illinois where he had been living.

Notes

1852 births
1909 deaths
Politicians from Chicago
Politicians from Racine, Wisconsin
Beloit College alumni
Businesspeople from Wisconsin
Republican Party members of the Wisconsin State Assembly
19th-century American politicians
19th-century American businesspeople